The geology of Africa is varied and complex, and gives rise to the wide variety of landscapes found across the continent.

The African continent rests over two main plates. The African plate, accounting for the whole of north Africa, and the Somali plate, which accounts for the eastern side of mid and southern Africa. The Somali plate is moving away from the African plate in a split from Djibouti in the north, to Eswatini in the south. The parting of these two plates formed the southern part of what used to be known as The Great Rift Valley. In geological terms, the African and Somali plate separation has formed the East African Rift System (EARS), comprising two separate rifts systems - the Eastern Rift Valley, and a western branch known as the Albertine Rift.

Two massive domes were formed, the Kenyan dome and the Ethiopian dome (known as the Ethiopian Highlands). The Albertine Rift follows the western edge of the Kenyan dome. This runs from Lake Malawi in the south, up into Lake Rukwa, Lake Tanganyika and Lake Albert in the north, where it ends. The Kenyan dome has the eastern branch of the EARS (known as The Gregory Rift) running through its middle, and contains most of what we historically saw as the Great Rift valley. Lake Victoria lies in the middle of the dome, with the Gregory Rift to the east of it. The Gregory rift has Lake Eyasi & Lake Manyara at its southern end, running north up to the west of Nairobi and continuing on through Kenya to Lake Turkana - which lies between the northern edge of the Kenyan dome and the southern edge of the Ethiopian dome.

Major geological events 

 Vredefort impact structure

Geological features 

 Central African Shear Zone

Geologists of Africa 

 Maria Wilman
 Hugo Dummett

Geological maps

See also 
:Category:Geologic groups of Africa
:Category:Stratigraphy of Africa

Further reading
Africa's Top Geological Sites (35th International Geological Congress Commemorative Volume), 2016

References

External links 
 United States Geological Survey maps of the geology of Africa (PDF)
 Interactive map of the topography of Africa - five selectable sources, including; OpenTopoMap, ESRI Topo & CyclOSM